Chinnanati Snehitulu is a 1971 Indian Telugu-language drama film, produced by DVS Raju under the DVS Productions banner and directed by K. Viswanath. It stars N. T. Rama Rao, Sobhan Babu and Vanisri, with music composed by T. V. Raju.

Plot
Srinivas Rao (N. T. Rama Rao) & Sridhar Rao (Jaggayya) are childhood bosom friends. Sridhar Rao is a business magnate whereas Srinivas Rao works as his manager. Sridhar Rao's daughter Aruna (Vanisri) is attached with Srinivasa Rao. Nagabhushnam (Rajanala) Sridhar Rao's brother-in-law, a crooked person, lives along with them and wants to grab the property by making Aruna's marriage with his son Rambabu (Rajababu). He is also has rivalry over Srinivasa Rao as he  obstructs him both in office & home. On the other hand, Srinivas Rao leads a happy family life with his good companion wife Lalitha (Devika) and blind mother (Santha Kumari). Once Aruna visits her friend's marriage where she gets acquaintance with her childhood friend Ravi (Shobhan Babu) both of them fell in love and they unite. Meanwhile, Sridhar Rao gets a heart attack when Aruna returns and notices herself as pregnant. At that point in time, Ravi who works in Air force dies in a plane crash, hearing upon, Aruna collapses and explains the entire situation to Srinivas Rao. Now Srinivas Rao plans with the help of Lalitha by making everyone believe that his wife is pregnant. He also convinces Sridhar Rao and brings Aruna to his house as a nurse. Aruna gives birth to the baby boy and goes back to her father leaving the child at Lalitha. Here Srinivas Rao feels relief, but now the real problem arises, Lalitha becomes really pregnant and she too gives birth to the baby boy. Nagabhushanam senses it, kidnaps Srinivas Rao's child and threatens Aruna to marry Rambabu. Aruna agrees and she tells her decision to her Sridhar Rao which leads to his death. After that, Aruna is forced to send Srinivas Rao away. But kind-hearted Srinivas Rao understands her situation, lands in disguise, breaks up Nagabhushanam's plan and saves Aruna. Surprisingly, Ravi held by enemies in the air crash also comes back. Finally, the movie ends on a happy note with the reunion of the entire family.

Cast
N. T. Rama Rao as Srinivasa Rao
Sobhan Babu as Ravi
Vanisri as Aruna
Jaggayya as Sridhar Rao 
Devika as Lalitha
Rajanala as Nagabhushanam
Raja Babu as Ramababu
Rao Gopal Rao 
Allu Ramalingaiah as Paanakaalu
Santha Kumari
Rama Prabha as Baby
Pushpa Kumari as Kasthuri

Soundtrack

Music composed by T. V. Raju. Lyrics were written by C. Narayana Reddy.

References

External links

1970s Telugu-language films
Indian buddy drama films
Films directed by K. Viswanath
Films scored by T. V. Raju
1970s buddy drama films
1971 drama films